Shirebrook is a town in the Bolsover district in Derbyshire, England. Close to the boundaries with the districts of Mansfield and Bassetlaw of Nottinghamshire, it had a population of 13,300 in 2001, reducing to 9,760 at the 2011 Census. It is on the B6407, and close to the A632 road, between Mansfield and Bolsover.

The town is served by Shirebrook railway station, on the Robin Hood Line.

Economy

History
According to David Mills in A Dictionary of British Place-Names, the area was first named in records in 1202 written in Old English as Scirebroc. This can be interpreted as Boundary or Bright Brook.

Prior to the intense and swift development of the Colliery at the turn of the 20th century, Shirebrook, even as late as 1872 it was little more than a chapelry of the larger Pleasley. Wilsons' Imperial Gazetteer of England and Wales of 1870–72 describes "SHIREBROOK, a chapelry in Pleaseley parish, Derby; 3¾ miles NNW of Mansfield r. station. It was constituted in 1849, and it has a post-office under Mansfield. Pop., 342. Houses, 70. The living is a vicarage in the diocese of Lichfield. Value, £90.* Patron, the Rector of Pleaseley. The church was built in 1843."

Shirebrook Colliery was sunk in 1896–1897 by the Shirebrook Coal and Iron company on land owned by the Duke of Devonshire, Joseph Paget (a Pleasley Mills partner and the builder of Stuffynwood Hall), and the Nicholson and Fowler farming families. Professor Arnold Lupton of Sheffield was the mining engineer. The sinking of two shafts, plus a pumping shaft, was based on independent surveys by Henry Hall and Matthew Fisher, managers of working collieries.

By 1897, a 'model village' was already being built close to the colliery to house workers. The Derbyshire Times of 30 July 1897 reported that "About half a mile away a model village is springing up, some 150 houses have already been erected and about 420 are to be built."

Shirebrook Colliery operated in the town until April 1993. It had previously been linked underground to nearby Pleasley Colliery. The workforce was about evenly split during the strike of 1984–85, leading to deep community divisions between strikers and workers, and briefly earned the nickname "the Belfast of England".

In addition to two ongoing fabrication-engineering businesses at nearby Langwith, Shirebrook has a large furniture retailer.

Regeneration

The 93-acre former Shirebrook Colliery site was reclaimed for development at a cost of £24million, funded by English Partnerships and administered by East Midlands Development Agency.

Sports Direct hub
Re-titled as Brook Park, half of the entire business park designated as Zone 1 was allocated to Sports Direct after a planning application to Bolsover District Council in 2004 for four giant warehouses totalling 111,000 square metres, with a training facility, helipad and a retail store. 

Sports Direct amongst its 3,000 workers employs large number of people who decided to migrate to Shirebrook from eastern states of European Union

The situation caused certain group of locals feel intimidated, reportedly by gatherings in the town square and other open public places, involving drinking and other anti-social behaviour. Councillors and Derbyshire Police therefore introduced in late 2015 a Public Space Protection Order (PSPO), upgraded from the previous Direct Public Policing Orders (DPPOs), banning consumption of alcohol with further restrictions in public spaces.

Many workers are indirectly employed by agencies using zero-hour contracts, which has attracted media attention for their labour practices and has been referred to as a "gulag". Having declined to appear previously, billionaire owner Mike Ashley was summoned to appear at Parliament before June 2016 to answer questions from a select committee of MPs. Ashley responded in March 2016 by publicly refusing the summons, further declaring the MPs to be "a joke".

Ashley eventually appeared before Parliament on 7 June 2016. Outstanding areas of concern were mentioned, including zero-hour contracts, lower than minimum-wage payments, workers' body searches, intrusive control of workers' personal habits, lateness penalties and sexual harassment. Ashley gave an undertaking to investigate and make changes, but suggested a timeframe of three months or greater may be required.

Ashley was further criticised in 2017 by Labour Party leader Jeremy Corbyn for breaking his word by failing to enforce the withdrawal of widespread zero-hour contracts that he had agreed to in 2016. Corbyn's request for the UK Prime Minister to condemn Ashley's failure to end the practice was reported in the press as being "sidestepped" by Theresa May.

A Polish couple who supplied workers to Sports Direct were accused of modern-day slavery in 2016. They absconded before their scheduled trial appearance at Nottingham Crown Court in July 2017 and were believed by Police to be in Canada, despite having their Polish passports seized.

Community building
In December 2017, the government through their Minister for Faith and Communities, Lord Bourne, announced a £1.26 million aid-package from the Controlling Migration Fund, after a bid from local networking groups Bolsover Partnership and Shirebrook Forward NG20 due to the large influx of Eastern European workers.

The money is a two-year investment intended to improve access to public services, stage community events, improve the shopping and Market Square area and ease pressures on housing, schooling and health services resulting from recent migration.

The project named Building Resilience will see investment into seven core areas:

Community resilience
Market Square Enlivenment
Migrant community access
Improve access and quality of private sector housing
Social Norms and UK Laws
Additional GP resources
Healthy Workforce Programme

Shirebrook Town Hall was constructed as a new build on the site of a former storage unit on the market square. It opened in 2019 as a 'one stop shop' with customer contact centre and payment counter at ground floor level, and offices for Town Council and Bolsover District business above.

Housing
As part of the government's Levelling Up initiative, a plan to create affordable homes on part of the former colliery site has seen the First Homes  pilot scheme established to allow local first-time buyers and key workers to buy new builds at a 30% discount of the market price.

Education
Shirebrook Academy on Common Lane is the local secondary school for pupils aged 11–16.

Shirebrook also has many primary schools and nurseries such as:
 Park Infant & Nursery Schools
 Park Junior School
 Stubbin Wood Special School
 Brookfield Primary School
 Model Village Primary School

Railway
Shirebrook once had three railway stations. The last remaining station was on the Midland Railway (later part of the LMS) route from Nottingham to Worksop via Mansfield, and was originally known as Shirebrook West, despite being on the eastern edge of the town. The route lost its passenger services in October 1964, leaving Shirebrook without a station, but the line remained open as a goods route. On the site of the goods yard a diesel locomotive fuelling depot was opened in the mid-1960s. The station was re-opened in 1998 as Shirebrook railway station for the new Robin Hood Line services from Nottingham to Worksop via Mansfield. A wagon repair and manufacturing business have a rail link with the main line.
 
Shirebrook North station (originally known as "Langwith Junction", until renamed in June 1924), was opened by the Lancashire, Derbyshire and East Coast Railway (later part of the Great Central Railway and subsequently the London & North Eastern Railway) in March 1897 and closed in September 1955. By then only one of the four routes converging on it was left- that to Lincoln: the Great Northern Railway's "Leen Valley Extension" line to Pleasley and Sutton-in-Ashfield had closed in September 1931; the LD&ECR line to Beighton via Clowne in September 1939, and that to Chesterfield via Bolsover in December 1951, due to the unsafe condition of Bolsover Tunnel. The filling in of the tunnel began on 10 October 1966, and used waste from Bolsover Colliery. The mouth of the old tunnel can be found on the southern edge of Scarcliffe, emerging just south of Ridgdale Road, Bolsover.

Shirebrook South station was on the Great Northern Railway's "Leen Valley Extension" line mentioned above, opened in November 1901 and closed in September 1931.

Sport
The town's football club Shirebrook Town play in the First Division of the Northern Counties East Football League, and are based at Langwith Road.  Before the current club was formed, Shirebrook Miners Welfare F.C. was the senior team in the area, competing in the FA Cup on occasion.

Notable people
Mason Bennett, footballer, born in nearby Langwith and attended school in Shirebrook
John Hurt, actor, born in nearby Chesterfield and lived in Shirebrook as a child 
Jason Statham, actor, born in Shirebrook
Colin Tarrant, actor, born in Shirebrook
Ray Wilson, footballer, born in Shirebrook

See also
Listed buildings in Shirebrook

References

External links

 Local information
 Shirebrook Town Council
 Photos of Shirebrook
 Photographs of Shirebrook

 
Towns in Derbyshire
Civil parishes in Derbyshire
Bolsover District